Shanghainese is a variety of Wu Chinese spoken in the central districts of the City of Shanghai and its surrounding areas.

Shanghainese may also refer to:
Shanghainese people
Shanghainese cuisine